24 Cancri (abbreviated to 24 Cnc) is a triple star system in the constellation Cancer. The system is located about 226 light-years (69 parsecs) away, based on its parallax.

The primary component in the star system is designated 24 Cancri A. It is a F-type main sequence star.

The secondary component, designated 24 Cancri B, is also a F-type main-sequence star and is itself a binary with an orbital period of about 22 years.

References

Cancer (constellation)
Triple star systems
Cancri, 24
F-type giants
F-type main-sequence stars
071152 3
041389
3312
Durchmusterung objects